Raymo  is a 2022 Indian Kannada-language musical romantic drama film written and directed by Pawan Wadeyar, and produced by C. R. Manohar under Jayaditya Films banners. The film stars Ishaan and Ashika Ranganath in pivotal roles. The music is composed by Arjun Janya. 

Raymo was released on 25 November 2022 and received positive reviews from critics.

Plot 
Revanth Deshpande alias Raymo is a spoilt rockstar dealing with intense family conflicts: he believes that his adopted mother is an evil gold-digger and passionately hates his father for remarrying soon after his biological mother's death. When an international music gig commands him to scout a singing talent, Raymo comes across Mohana, a dedicated classical singer who is worlds apart from Raymo. However, the two fall for one another in a manner that they complete each other and vow to stay together regardless of the hardships. However, Raymo undergo a categorical change after his father's death and his adopted mother's sacrifices, where he ignores Mohana and takes over his father's business. Mohana misunderstands Raymo and gets enraged, where she works hard and becomes a more famous rock star like him. Before her wedding reception, Mohana gets cleared about her misunderstandings and cancels her wedding, where she finds Raymo at their favourite spot and they finally reunite with each other.

Cast 
Ishan as Revanth Deshpande 
Ashika Ranganath as Mohana
Madhoo as Revanth's adopted mother
Rajesh Natranga as Revanth's P.A. 
Achyuth Kumar as Mohana's father

Release
The film was released on 25 November 2022 in theatres.

Home media 
The satellite and digital rights were sold to Zee Kannada and ZEE5.

Reception 
Sridevi S of The Times of India gave 3 out of 5 stars and wrote "Director Pavan Wadeyar has, in places, resurrected Googly. He also strikes the right chord in emotional scenes. Overall, Pavan has done a thorough job. Since this is a musical love story, Arjun Janya could have experimented a bit with the music which just sits right with the story and doesn’t stand out." OTTPlay gave 2.5 out 5 stars and wrote "Raymo, definitely has a few moments to savour but the gross silliness and lack of logic in the story, particularly in the second half, come as major disservices. If you are willing to test out what Kannada cinema has to offer this weekend, give ,Raymo, a chance but this review recommends that you proceed with caution."

References 

Indian drama films
2020s Kannada-language films
2022 films
Films shot in Karnataka
2022 drama films